John Stephen Hart (27 December 1866 - 28 May 1952) was an Australian Anglican bishop who was the Bishop of Wangaratta in the Church of England in Australia (now the Anglican Church of Australia).

Early life
Hart was born in Caulfield, Victoria, in 1866, the son of John Hart and his wife Mary, who was the daughter of Sir George Stephen. He was educated at East St Kilda Grammar School.

Education and ministry
Hart graduated from the University of Melbourne in 1887 and was ordained deacon in 1893 and priest in 1894. He served curacies at St Paul's, Geelong (1893-1896) and Christ Church, South Yarra (1896-1900). He was then the vicar of Holy Trinity Benalla (1900-1903), St Anselm's Middle Park (1904-1907) and St Martin's Hawksburn (1907-1914).

In 1912 Hart was appointed to the theological staff at Trinity College, Melbourne. In 1914 he became the Warden of St John's Theological College in St Kilda East. In September 1919 he was elected the Dean of Melbourne following the death of Charles Godby. He was appointed Bishop of Wangaratta in 1927 and retired in 1942.

Personal life
In 1900, at Christ Church, South Yarra, he married Catherine Buckhurst (1868-1942). Hart died in 1952, aged 85, and was buried at St Kilda Cemetery.

References

Sources
The Times, 2 May 1927
Australian Dictionary of Biography

Deans of Melbourne
Anglican bishops of Wangaratta
1866 births
1952 deaths
People from Caulfield, Victoria
University of Melbourne alumni
Religious leaders from Melbourne
Academic staff of the University of Melbourne